George McLoughlin (19 July 1879 – 30 June 1961), known professionally as Gibb McLaughlin, was an English film and stage actor.

Early days
McLaughlin was born in Sunderland, County Durham, England in 1879. For about 10 years he was a salesman in Kingston-upon-Hull where he sang in the Holy Trinity Church choir. He joined the Hull Amateur Operatic Society and played the part of Koko in The Mikado. After that he appeared with Anne Croft in concerts and they had a turn to themselves on the stage of the Palace Theatre. He performed as a comedian and monologist in music halls. In 1915, McLaughlin married Eleanor Morton, youngest daughter of William Morton, formerly manager of the Egyptian Hall, London and the Greenwich Theatre.

Film work
He appeared in 118 films between 1921 and 1959. He was known for The Lavender Hill Mob (1951), Oliver Twist (1948) and Hobson's Choice (1954). He had a rare leading role as the sleuth J.G. Reeder in Edgar Wallace's Mr Reeder in Room 13 (1938) released in the U.S. as Mystery of Room 13 (1941). Skeletal, lugubrious, latterly prune-faced, character actor, he was popular on screen as a master of disguise, which allowed him to slip into just about any ethnic part or Dickensian role.

Partial filmography

 The Road to London (1921) - The Count
 The Pointing Finger (1922) - The Monk
 The Bohemian Girl (1922) - Captain Florenstein
 Three to One Against (1923) - Cleric
 Constant Hot Water (1923) - Eardley Adams
 The Kensington Mystery (1924)
 Odd Tricks (1924)
 The Only Way (1925) - Barsad
 Somebody's Darling (1925)
 Nell Gwyn (1926) - Duke of York
 London (1926) - Ah Kwang
 The House of Marney (1927) - Ezra
 Madame Pompadour (1927) - Comte Maurepas
 The Arcadians (1927) - Peter Doody
 Poppies of Flanders (1927) - Shorty Bill
 The White Sheik (1928) - Jock
 The Farmer's Wife (1928) - Henry Coaker
 Not Quite a Lady (1928) - The Vicar
 The Price of Divorce (1928) - The Valet
 Glorious Youth (1929)
 The Silent House (1929) - Chang Fu
 Power Over Men (1929) - Alexandre Billot
 Kitty (1929) - The Electrician
 Such Is the Law (1930) - Valet - from 'The Price of Divorce' (archive footage)
 The W Plan (1930) - Pvt. McTavish
 The Woman from China (1930) - Chung-Li
 The Nipper (1930) - Bill Henshaw
 The School for Scandal (1930) - William
 Third Time Lucky (1931) - Unidentified Role
 Sally in Our Alley (1931) - Jim Sears
 Jealousy (1931) - Littleton Pardmore
 Potiphar's Wife (1931) - Chauffeur (uncredited)
 Detective Lloyd (1932) - Abdul - and Egyptian
 Goodnight, Vienna (1932) - Max's Orderly
 The First Mrs. Fraser (1932) - Butler
 Congress Dances (1932) - Bibikoff
 White Face (1932) - Sgt. Elk
 The Love Contract (1932) - Hodge
 Money Means Nothing (1932) - Augustus Bethersyde
 Where Is This Lady? (1932) - Dr. Schilling
 The Mistress of Atlantis (1932) - Count Velovsky
 The Temperance Fete (1932) - Mr. Hearty
 King of the Ritz (1933) - Baron Popov
 Bitter Sweet (1933) - The Footman
 No Funny Business (1933) - Florey
 The Private Life of Henry VIII (1933) - The French Executioner
 Friday the Thirteenth (1933) - Florist
 The Thirteenth Candle (1933) - Captain Blythe
 High Finance (1933) - Sir Grant Rayburn
 Britannia of Billingsgate (1933) - Westerbrook
 Swinging the Lead (1934) - Inigo Larsen
 The Rise of Catherine the Great (1934) - Bestujhev
 The Queen's Affair (1934) - General Korensky
 Dick Turpin (1934) - Governor of Newgate
 Chu Chin Chow (1934) - The Caliph's Vizier
 The Church Mouse (1934) - Thomas Stubbings, Cashier
 Blossom Time (1934) - Bauernfeld
 Little Friend (1934) - Thompson
 There Goes Susie (1934) - Advertising Manager
 Jew Süss (1934) - Pancorgo (uncredited)
 The Iron Duke (1934) - Talleyrand
 The Old Curiosity Shop (1934) - Sampson Brass
 The Scarlet Pimpernel (1934) - The Barber
 The Dictator (1935)
 Drake of England (1935) - Don Enriquez
 Me and Marlborough (1935) - Old Soldier 
 Bulldog Jack (1935) - Denny
 I Give My Heart (1935) - De Brissac
 Hyde Park Corner (1935) - Sir Arthur Gannett
 Two's Company (1936) - Toombs
 Broken Blossoms (1936) - Evil Eye
 Where There's a Will (1936) - Martin, The Butler
 Juggernaut (1936) - Jacques
 Irish for Luck (1936) - Thady
 Two's Company (1936)
 All In (1936) - Rev. Cuppleditch
 You Live and Learn (1937) - Mons. Duval
 Mr. Reeder in Room 13 (1938) - Mr. J.G. Reeder
 Break the News (1938) - The Superintendent
 Almost a Gentleman (1938) - Bartholomew Quist
 13 Men and a Gun (1938) - Col. Vlatin
 Hold My Hand (1938) - Bank Manager
 Hey! Hey! USA (1938) - Ship's Steward
 Inspector Hornleigh (1939) - Alfred Cooper, Pheasant Inn Porter
 Come On George! (1939) - Dr. MacGregor
 Confidential Lady (1940) - Sheriff
 Spy for a Day (1940) - Col. Ludwig
 That's the Ticket (1940) - The Count
 Freedom Radio (1941) - Dr. Weiner
 Spellbound (1941) - Gibb
 Penn of Pennsylvania (1942) - Indian Chief
 The First of the Few (1942) - Sir Ian MacLaren (uncredited)
 The Young Mr. Pitt (1942) - George Selwyn (uncredited)
 Much Too Shy (1942) - Rev. Sheepshanks
 Tomorrow We Live (1943) - Dupont
 My Learned Friend (1943) - Butler
 Champagne Charlie (1944) - Doctor at Duel (uncredited)
 Give Us the Moon (1944) - Marcel
 Caesar and Cleopatra (1945) - High Priest (uncredited)
 No Orchids for Miss Blandish (1948) - Butler (uncredited)
 Oliver Twist (1948) - Mr. Sowerberry
 Once Upon a Dream (1949) - Mr. Pontefact I
 The Queen of Spades (1949) - Bird seller
 Night and the City (1950) - Googin the Forger (uncredited)
 The Black Rose (1950) - Wilderkin
 The Lavender Hill Mob (1951) - Godwin
 The House in the Square (1951) - Jacob (uncredited)
 The Card (1952) - Emery
 The Pickwick Papers (1952) - Foreman
 Top Secret (1952) - Schoolmaster
 The Man Who Watched Trains Go By (1952) - Julius de Koster, Sr
 Grand National Night (1953) - Morton
 The Million Pound Note (1954) - Sir William Collinge (uncredited)
 Hobson's Choice (1954) - Tudsbury
 The Brain Machine (1955) - Mr. Spencer Simon
 The Deep Blue Sea (1955) - Clerk
 The Man Who Never Was (1956) - Club Porter
 Who Done It? (1956) - Scientist
 Sea Wife (1957) - Club Porter
 The Naked Truth (1957) - Old Man in TV Show Audience (uncredited)
 Too Many Crooks (1959) - Vicar (uncredited)

References

External links

1884 births
1960 deaths
English male film actors
English male silent film actors
People from Sunderland
Male actors from Tyne and Wear
20th-century English male actors